Aiouea acarodomatifera is a species of plant in the family Lauraceae. It is endemic to Brazil.

References

acarodomatifera
Flora of Brazil
Near threatened plants
Taxonomy articles created by Polbot